John Cork (fl. 1414–1443), of Paderda in Menheniot, Cornwall, was an English politician.

He was a Member (MP) of the Parliament of England for Helston in 1419, Liskeard in 1420 and 1422, and Bodmin in 1423.

References

Year of birth missing
15th-century deaths
15th-century English people
Medieval Cornish people
Members of the pre-1707 English Parliament for constituencies in Cornwall